Spectrum is the first album by the electronic musician, Jega, released in 1998 on Planet Mu. The album peaked at #155 on the CMJ Radio Top 200 and #12 on the CMJ RPM Charts in the U.S.

Track listing

External links
Spectrum at the Planet Mu website

References

1998 debut albums
Jega (musician) albums
Planet Mu albums